= House of Religions, Hannover =

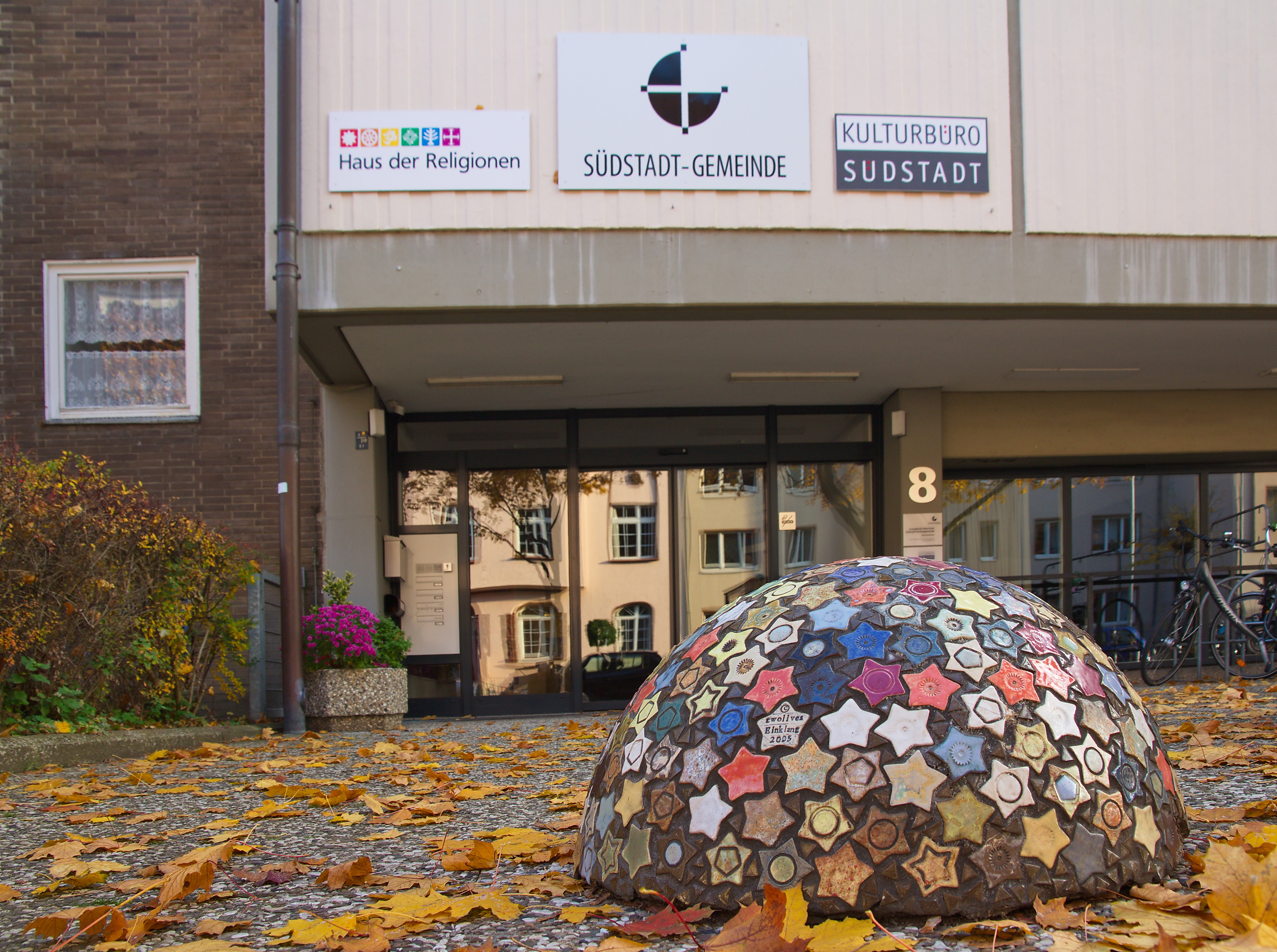
House of Religions

The House of Religions (German: Haus der Religionen) is located in Hanover, Germany, on the former location of the Athanasiuskirche. Held by Haus der Religionen Hannover e.V., an organization established on 2 December 2008 by people from seven religions (Baháʼí, Buddhism, Christianity, Hinduism, Islam and Judaism) with the purpose of promoting dialogue among the religions in Hanover.
